The 2014 Elite League speedway season was the 80th season of the top division of UK speedway and the took place between March and October 2014. The Poole Pirates were the defending champions after winning in 2013.

Summary
This season saw the first team line-up change since 2011, with the Leicester Lions replacing the Peterborough Panthers who dropped down a division. Ahead of the season the BSPA announced a new rule called the "Fast Track Scheme" which means every side has to use two British youngsters at reserve who have passed through the National League - the third tier of British speedway.

Poole Pirates won their second consecutive Elite League title, defeating Coventry Bees 90–71 in the Grand Final. Poole continued their success, their sixth league title in eleven years. Darcy Ward, Maciej Janowski, Przemysław Pawlicki and Josh Grajczonek all returned for Poole and they were backed up by Kyle Newman and Václav Milík Jr.

Final league table

Play-offs

Draw

Semi-finals

Grand final

Knockout Cup
The Knockout Cup was not held during 2014.

Final Leading averages

Riders & averages
Belle Vue

 8.84
 8.25
 6.97
 5.95
 5.61
 5.40
 2.73
 2.00

Birmingham

 7.13
 6.95
 6.41
 6.17
 5.65
 4.86
 4.00
 2.72

Coventry

 8.69 
 8.63 
 7.91
 6.91
 6.74
 6.51
 5.97
 5.78
 5.63
 5.27

Eastbourne

 8.95
 7.79
 7.24
 6.98
 6.62
 6.10
 4.24

Kings Lynn

 9.62
 8.13
 7.97
 7.01
 6.43
 5.94
 5.92
 5.86

Lakeside

 7.55
 7.52
 7.51
 7.23
 7.12
 6.54
 5.57
 5.52
 5.27

Leicester

 8.67
 7.42
 6.76
 6.51
 6.34
 5.67
 5.64
 5.52
 5.11
 4.58
 4.50
 3.48

Poole

 9.24
 8.70
 8.67 (4 matches only)
 8.30
 7.23
 7.20
 7.09
 6.91
 3.00
 2.38
 2.15 (4 matches only)
 2.14

Swindon

 8.46
 8.26
 7.42
 7.10
 7.09
 6.39
 5.89
 2.84
 2.36

Wolverhampton

 8.36
 7.73
 6.76
 6.54
 6.50
 5.84
 5.45
 5.33
 5.32
 4.12

See also
 List of United Kingdom Speedway League Champions

Notes

References

SGB Premiership
Elite League
Speedway Elite